Don't Be a Dummy is a 1932 British comedy film directed by Frank Richardson and starring William Austin, Muriel Angelus and Garry Marsh. The film was a quota quickie made by the British subsidiary of Warner Brothers at their Teddington Studios base.

Cast
 William Austin as Lord Tony Probus  
 Muriel Angelus as Lady Diana Summers  
 Garry Marsh as Captain Fitzgerald  
 Georgie Harris as Dodds  
 Mike Johnson as Tramp  
 Sally Stewart as Florrie  
 Catherine Watts as Connie Sylvester
 Charles Castella

References

Bibliography
Chibnall, Steve. Quota Quickies: The Birth of the British 'B' Film. British Film Institute, 2007.
Low, Rachael. Filmmaking in 1930s Britain. George Allen & Unwin, 1985.
Wood, Linda. British Films, 1927–1939. British Film Institute, 1986.

External links
 

1932 films
1932 comedy films
British comedy films
Films shot at Teddington Studios
Films directed by Frank Richardson
Films set in England
British black-and-white films
1930s English-language films
1930s British films